Gelsomina Vono, known as Silvia (born 14 March 1969) is an Italian politician and member of the Senate of the Republic.

Early life 
Vono was born in Catanzaro.

Political career 
In the 2018 Italian general election, Vono was elected as a member of the Five Star Movement. On 25 September 2019 she joined Matteo Renzi's Italia Viva.

On 21 January 2022, on the eve of the 2022 Italian presidential election, she left Italia Viva to join Forza Italia, criticizing the attitude of her former party for the regional elections in Calabria of the previous October and for the imminent presidential election.

References 

Living people
Italian political party founders
Five Star Movement politicians
Italia Viva politicians
Forza Italia (2013) politicians
Forza Italia (2013) senators
Senators of Legislature XVIII of Italy
21st-century Italian politicians
21st-century Italian women politicians
People from Catanzaro
1969 births
20th-century Italian women
Women members of the Senate of the Republic (Italy)